KWGB (97.9 FM) is a country music radio station serving western Kansas from Colby, Kansas, United States. Its slogan is "Hot New Country."

External links

WGB
Country radio stations in the United States